The Carr River is a river in the U.S. state of Rhode Island. It flows approximately 6 km (4 mi). There are three dams along the river's length.

Course
The river rises from Carr Pond in West Greenwich. It flows roughly due west past Tarbox and Capwell Mill Ponds to its confluence with the Big River.

Crossings
Below is a list of all crossings over the Carr River. The list starts at the headwaters and goes downstream.
West Greenwich
Hopkins Hill Road
New London Turnpike
Burnt Sawmill Road

Tributaries
Mud Bottom Brook is the Carr River's only named tributary, though it has many unnamed streams that also feed it.

See also
List of rivers in Rhode Island

References
Maps from the United States Geological Survey

Rivers of Kent County, Rhode Island
West Greenwich, Rhode Island
Rivers of Rhode Island
Tributaries of Providence River